Gordon Hartogensis (born June 17, 1970) is an American businessman, investor, and government official who has served as the Director of the Pension Benefit Guaranty Corporation (PBGC) since 2019. At PBGC, he has led the agency during the multiemployer pension crisis and the COVID-19 pandemic.

Career
Hartogensis left a brief career on Wall Street to join two classmates from Stanford as an equal partner in a startup software company called Petrolsoft Corporation. After the company was acquired by Aspen Technology,  Hartogensis served in a leadership role until June 2002.

Shortly after his departure from Aspen Technology, Hartogensis founded Auric Technology LLC. As founder and chief executive officer, he was instrumental in the development of customer relationship management software solutions and support. Auric Technology was sold to Telnorm in 2011.

After the sale of Auric Technology, he managed a portfolio of private equity, venture capital, real estate, and angel investments. He also served as an advisor to several portfolio companies.

Pension Benefit Guaranty Corporation (PBGC)
Hartogensis was nominated for the position of Director of the Pension Benefit Guaranty Corporation on May 15, 2018. He was confirmed by the United States Senate on April 30, 2019 by a vote of 72–27. He was sworn in as Director on May 15, 2019.

When Hartogensis took the helm of the PBGC in 2019, the agency faced a crisis in its multiemployer insurance program which was projected to be insolvent by 2025 and had a financial deficit of over 65 billion dollars. He worked with both parties in Congress to try to find a bipartisan solution to the crisis, and he testified before the Senate Finance Committee in December 2019.  The American Rescue Plan Act of 2021 which was signed into law by President Biden on March 11, 2021, provided $86 billion to address the multiemployer pension crisis. The law created Special Financial Assistance (SFA), a rescue program for financially troubled multiemployer pension plans. The SFA program was implemented by the PBGC under Hartogensis' leadership. PBGC's 2021 annual report reflected the impact of SFA, and the agency reported positive financial positions in both its single-employer and multiemployer insurance programs for the first time in over 20 years.

On July 13, 2022, the Partnership for Public Service rated PBGC number one in "2021 Best Places to Work in the Federal Government" among small agencies. Hartogensis accepted the award on behalf of PBGC.

Personal life
Hartogensis is married to Grace Chao, the sister of Elaine Chao, the Secretary of Labor under George W. Bush and the Secretary of Transportation under Donald Trump.

Hartogensis is the brother-in-law of Mitch McConnell, the sitting Senate Minority Leader.

References

1970 births
Living people
Connecticut Republicans
Pension Benefit Guaranty Corporation